orbit@home was a BOINC-based volunteer computing project of the Planetary Science Institute.  It uses the "Orbit Reconstruction, Simulation and Analysis" framework to optimize the search strategies that are used to find near-Earth objects.

On March 4, 2008, orbit@home completed the installation of its new server and officially opened to new members. On April 11, orbit@home launched a Windows version of their client. On February 16, 2013, the project was halted due to lack of grant funding. However, on July 23, 2013, the Orbit@home project was selected for funding by NASA's Near Earth Object Observation program.  It was announced that orbit@home is to resume operations sometime in 2014 or 2015. As of July 13, 2018, orbit@home is offline according to its website, and the upgrade announcement has been removed.

See also
List of volunteer computing projects

References

External links
 

Science in society
Free science software
Volunteer computing projects
Near-Earth object tracking